Erebuni may refer to:

Erebuni Fortress, the fortress of ancient kingdom of Urartu, now territory of Armenia
Yerevan, capital of Armenia originated from the Erebuni Fortress
Erebuni SC, an association football club based in Yerevan
Erebuni-Homenmen FC, defunct association football club based in Yerevan between 1992 and 2000
Erebuni District, an administrative district of Yerevan
Erebuni Museum, history and archeological museum near the Erebuni Fortress of Yerevan 
Erebuni Airport, a joint civil and military airport in Yerevan